The Senior women's race at the 2003 IAAF World Cross Country Championships was held at the L'Institut Équestre National in Avenches near Lausanne, Switzerland, on March 29, 2003.  Reports of the event were given in The New York Times, in the Herald, and for the IAAF.

Complete results for individuals, for teams, medallists, and the results of British athletes who took part were published.

Race results

Senior women's race (7.92 km)

Individual

†: Pamela Chepchumba from  finished 6th in 26:35 min, Asmae Leghzaoui from  finished 18th in 27:39 min, but both
were disqualified.

Teams

Note: Athletes in parentheses did not score for the team result (n/s: nonscorer)

Participation
According to an unofficial count, 65 athletes from 25 countries participated in the Senior women's race.

 (1)
 (4)
 (6)
 (1)
 (1)
 (6)
 (1)
 (1)
 (1)
 (1)
 (6)
 (1)
 (4)
 (1)
 (6)
 (1)
 (6)
 (3)
 (2)
 (1)
 (2)
 (6)
 (1)
 (1)
 (1)

See also
 2003 IAAF World Cross Country Championships – Senior men's race
 2003 IAAF World Cross Country Championships – Men's short race
 2003 IAAF World Cross Country Championships – Junior men's race
 2003 IAAF World Cross Country Championships – Women's short race
 2003 IAAF World Cross Country Championships – Junior women's race

References

Senior women's race at the World Athletics Cross Country Championships
IAAF World Cross Country Championships
2003 in women's athletics